This is the List of municipalities in Düzce Province, Turkey .

References 

Geography of Düzce Province
Duzce